Hebeloma hetieri is a species of mushroom in the family Hymenogastraceae.

hetieri
Fungi of Europe